Nadine Agyemang-Heard (born 13 March 2002) is an Italian rower world champion at junior level at the World Rowing Junior Championships.

Achievements

References

External links
 

2002 births
Living people
Italian female rowers